Giulia Morlet (born 14 January 2002) is a French tennis player.

Morlet has a career high WTA singles ranking of 1175 achieved on 10 April 2017.

Morlet made her WTA main draw debut at the 2017 French Open in the doubles draw partnering Diane Parry. They were defeated by Kiki Bertens and Johanna Larsson in the first round.

Morlet played college tennis at Arizona State University.

References

External links

2002 births
Living people
French female tennis players
21st-century French women